Barry Nix was an English footballer who played as a defender. He was a three-time First Team All American soccer player at Columbia University

Soccer
Nix, a native of Rotherham, England, was recruited to play soccer at Columbia University in the United States. Over the course of his four-year career with the Lions, 1978 to 1981, Nix established himself as one of the best collegiate soccer players. He earned first team All American recognition in 1978, 1979 and 1981 and second team in 1980.

References

External links
 Columbia Hall of Fame
 Wedding announcement, 3 November 1991, The New York Times

Living people
English footballers
Columbia Lions men's soccer players
English businesspeople
All-American men's college soccer players
Association football defenders
Year of birth missing (living people)